Il teatro alla moda (The Fashionable Theater) is a satirical pamphlet in which its author, the Venetian composer Benedetto Marcello (1686–1739), vents his critical opinions on the milieu of the Italian opera seria in the first decades of the eighteenth century. It was first published anonymously in Venice, by the end of 1720. Virtually every aspect of opera seria and its social environment is mercilessly criticized by Marcello: the artificiality of plots, the stereotyped format of music, the extravagant scenography and machinery, the inability and venality of composers and poets, the vanity and vulgarity of singers, the avidity of impresarios, the ineptitude of musicians.

The full title reads "THE FASHIONABLE THEATER – OR – safe and easy METHOD for correctly composing and performing Italian OPERAS in the modern style, – In which – useful and necessary Advice is given to Librettists, Composers, Musicians of both sexes, Impresarios, Performers, Engineers, and Scene Painters, comic Characters, Tailors, Pages, Dancers, Prompters, Copyists, Protectors, and MOTHERS of female Virtuoso singers, & other People belonging to Theater." In fact, Il teatro alla moda is written as a series of chapters where advice is ironically given to the various people involved in operatic productions, in order to meet "the modern customs" and bizarre requirements of such theatrical events.

Besides the title, the frontispiece contains several allusions to well-known protagonists of the Venetian theater of the time. For instance, the publisher's name "Aldiviva Licante" refers, by means of anagrams, both to Antonio Vivaldi, then very famous as an opera composer, and to the singer Caterina Canteli.

The text of Il teatro alla moda displays several striking features. To begin with, it shows a degree of vacillation in attitude toward its subject – perhaps resulting from Marcello's personal ambivalence regarding operatic music, as both a critic and a composer. For example, the dedicatory is by "the author of the book to its composer." In addition, it exhibits a number of surrealistic elements, which reach a climax in the last chapter, "The Raffle" (presumably organized by the mother of a young female singer), where the prizes include "a full dress of modern poet in fever-colored tree bark, wrapped with metaphors, translations, hyperboles" as well as "the pen that wrote Il teatro alla moda." The printing accompanies these peculiarities with a chaotic use of italic and normal typography and of capital fonts.

Translated excerpts (typography preserved)

"To the Poets – In the first place, the modern Poet should not have read and should never read the ancient Authors, Latin or Greek. And this is because the ancient Greeks or Latins have never read the moderns."

"To the Music Composers – The modern Music Composer should possess no knowledge about the Rules of good composition, except for some principle of universal practice... He should not understand the numeric Musical Proportions, nor the optimal effect of contrary Motions, or the bad Relation of Tritones and augmented Intervals."
 
"To the Singers – It is not necessary that the VIRTUOSO can read, or write, or have a good pronunciation of vowels, and of single and double Consonants, or understand the sense of Words, etc., but it is better if he mistakes Senses, Letters, Syllables, etc., in order to perform Ornaments, Trills, Appoggiature, very long Cadences, etc. etc. etc."

"To the Mothers of Female Singers – When the Girls have an audition with the Impresario, they (the mothers) will move the mouth with them, will prompt them the usual Ornaments and Trills and, asked about the age of the Virtuosa, will cut down at least ten years."

Further reading
 Benedetto Marcello, Il Teatro alla Moda (Castelvecchi, Roma, 1993).
 Eleanor Selfridge-Field, Marcello, Sant'Angelo, and Il Teatro alla Moda, in L. Bianconi and G. Morelli, eds. Antonio Vivaldi. Teatro musicale, cultura e società, vol. II (Olschki, Firenze, 1982).
 A discussion and full English translation is published in Musical Quarterly:

Il teatro alla moda
Il teatro alla moda
Opera history
Il teatro alla moda
1720 books
Italian music history